Paraclinus integripinnis, the reef finspot, is a species of labrisomid blenny native to the Pacific coast of North America from southern California to Baja California. It can reach a length of  TL.

References

integripinnis
Fish described in 1880